Laxmi Narayan Mishra (17 December 1903–19 August 1987) was born in the village of Basti in Maunath Bhanjan district, United Provinces of Agra and Oudh. Mishra was a popular play writer of Hindi literature.

He was a theatre personality of Uttar Pradesh. His works became very popular between 1930 and 1950, and they were frequently staged by schools, colleges, and amateur groups.

Main Works
Ashok-1926
Sanyasi-1930
Rakshas ka mandir-1931 (Temple of Demons)
Muktika rahasya-1932 (Secret of Freedom)
Sindur ki Holi-1933 (Holi with Vermillion)
Garuda Dhawaj-1945 (Flag with Garida"s Figure)
Vatsaraj-1950
Chakravyuh-1953 (Chakra formation)
Samaj ke Stambha (Pillars of Society)
Gudiya ka Ghar(A Doll's House)
Chakravyuha ( Play based on  Mahabharata  Character Abhimanyu, printed by kaushambhi prakashan, Dara gunj, Allahabad 1973, 25th edition)

See also
 List of Indian writers
Sahitya Academy

References

Indian male dramatists and playwrights
Hindi-language writers
1903 births
1987 deaths
People from Mau district
People from Mau
Dramatists and playwrights from Uttar Pradesh
20th-century Indian dramatists and playwrights
20th-century Indian male writers